Timberlake is a census-designated place (CDP) in McKinley and Cibola counties, New Mexico, United States. It was first listed as a CDP prior to the 2020 census.

Demographics

Education
The portion in McKinley County is in Gallup-McKinley County Public Schools. It is zoned to Ramah Elementary School and Ramah Middle-High School.

References 

Census-designated places in McKinley County, New Mexico
Census-designated places in Cibola County, New Mexico
Census-designated places in New Mexico